Larong or Zlarong is a recently documented Sino-Tibetan language spoken in Zogang and Markam counties of southeastern Chamdo, Tibet. It was recently documented by Zhao (2018) and Suzuki & Nyima (2018). Zhao (2018) tentatively classifies Zlarong as a Qiangic language.

Names
Larong is referred to by the Changdu Gazetteer (2005) as Rumei 如美话, as it is spoken in Rumei Township 如美乡, Markam County.

Zhao (2018) reports the autonym  and the Tibetan exonym  for the speakers.

Nyina & Suzuki (2019) report the autonym m̥a55, which is identical to the Drag-yab autonym also reported by them (m̥a55 ~ ma55).

Jiang (2023) refers to the language as Laronghua (拉茸话).

Locations
Renguo Township 仁果乡, Mdzo sgang County 左贡县 (Suzuki & Nyima 2018; Zhao 2018), including the village of Phagpa 坝巴村
Cuowa Township 措瓦乡, Markam County 芒康县
Rumei Township 如美镇, Markam County 芒康县 (Changdu Gazetteer 2005), including the village of Tangre Chaya 达日村
Qudeng Township 曲登乡, Markam County 芒康县 (two villages)

Larong villages by township:

A computational phylogenetic analysis by Jiang (2022) shows that Rumei (如美话) to be the most divergent Chamdo, and is not closely related to the Larong dialect (拉茸话) of Zogang County (左贡县).

Dialects
Larong is spoken in four townships in the Larong valley, along the Lancang River (also known as the Zla chu or Lachu River in Tibetan). The four townships are:

Ringo (Chinese: Renguo)
Tshonga (Chinese: Cuowa): Larong villages are Tshonga, Rushul, Thosa, Thaya, Drori, and Kuze
Rongsmad (Chinese: Rumei): Larong speakers in entire town
Choedan (Chinese: Qudeng): Dempa (Chinese: Dengba) and Choedan village clusters, both Larong-speaking

The dialect spoken in Ringo and Tshonga differs from that of the dialect spoken in Rongsmad and Choedan.

Classification
Suzuki & Nyima (2018) note that Zlarong (Larong) is closely related to two other recently documented Sino-Tibetan languages of Chamdo, eastern Tibet, namely Lamo and Drag-yab (spoken in southern Zhag'yab County).

Vocabulary
Zhao (2018: 1-3) lists the following Zlarong words.

References

Zhao, Haoliang. 2018. A brief introduction to Zlarong, a newly recognized language in Mdzo sgang, TAR. Proceedings of the 51st International Conference on Sino-Tibetan Languages and Linguistics (2018). Kyoto: Kyoto University.

Unclassified Sino-Tibetan languages
Languages of China
Languages of Tibet